Iliyan Yordanov (Bulgarian: Илиян Йорданов; born 3 April 1989) is a Bulgarian professional footballer who currently plays as a midfielder for Maritsa Plovdiv.

Career
Yordanov started his career at Botev Plovdiv but left when the club went bankrupt in the early 2010 and subsequently joined Lyubimets 2007. During his career he also played abroad, first with Turkish side Denizlispor and then with Serbian side Borac Čačak.

Honours
Tsarsko Selo Sofia
 Bulgarian Second League: 2018–19

Lokomotiv Plovdiv
 Bulgarian Cup runner-up: 2012
 Bulgarian Supercup: 2012

Levski Sofia
 Bulgarian Cup runner-up: 2013

References

External links 
 Profile at LevskiSofia.info

1989 births
Living people
Bulgarian footballers
Bulgarian expatriate footballers
Botev Plovdiv players
FC Lyubimets players
PFC Lokomotiv Plovdiv players
PFC Levski Sofia players
Denizlispor footballers
FK Borac Čačak players
FC Vereya players
FC Tsarsko Selo Sofia players
FC Maritsa Plovdiv players
FC Vitosha Bistritsa players
Neftochimic Burgas players
First Professional Football League (Bulgaria) players
TFF First League players
Serbian SuperLiga players
Expatriate footballers in Turkey
Bulgarian expatriate sportspeople in Turkey
Expatriate footballers in Serbia
Bulgarian expatriate sportspeople in Serbia
Footballers from Plovdiv
Association football midfielders